Monochaetia is a genus of fungi in the family Sporocadaceae. Species in the genus are typically plant parasites and saprobes, and cause leaf spot diseases on various hosts.

The genus Monochaetia was introduced by Allescher in 1902, it had 23 species originally. Allescher (1902) also designated the type as Monochaetia monochaeta, which has a single apical appendage (Guba 1961; Maharachch. et al. 2014; Senanayake et al. 2015). Steyaert (in 1949) transferred numerous Monochaetia species to Pestalotiopsis or Truncatella. More than 40 species of Monochaetia were recognised by the monograph of Guba (1961). There are 127 Monochaetia epithets in the Index Fungorum (as of 31 March 2022) and most have been transferred to other genera such as Sarcostroma, Seimatosporium and Seiridium (Nag Raj 1993; Maharachch. et al. 2011, 2014, 2016).

Species
As accepted by Species Fungorum;

Monochaetia breviformis 
Monochaetia caffra 
Monochaetia camelliae 
Monochaetia carissae 
Monochaetia caryotae 
Monochaetia castaneae 
Monochaetia compta 
Monochaetia concentrica 
Monochaetia cornicola 
Monochaetia cryptomeriae 
Monochaetia curtisii 
Monochaetia cycadis 
Monochaetia dalbergiae 
Monochaetia dimorphospora 
Monochaetia diospyri 
Monochaetia elaeocarpi 
Monochaetia garciniae 
Monochaetia hirta 
Monochaetia hysteriiformis 
Monochaetia ilicina 
Monochaetia ilicis 
Monochaetia jabalpurensis 
Monochaetia junipericola 
Monochaetia karstenii 
Monochaetia lentisci 

Monochaetia mangiferae 
Monochaetia massachusettsianum 
Monochaetia monochaeta 
Monochaetia nodosporella 
Monochaetia osyridella 
Monochaetia pachyspora 
Monochaetia punicae 
Monochaetia quercus 
Monochaetia rhododendricola 
Monochaetia rosenwaldii 
Monochaetia rubi 
Monochaetia russeliae 
Monochaetia sabinae 
Monochaetia saccardoi 
Monochaetia salaccae 
Monochaetia schini 
Monochaetia seiridioides 
Monochaetia sinensis 
Monochaetia taphrinicola 
Monochaetia vernoniae

References

External links

Amphisphaeriales
Taxa named by Pier Andrea Saccardo